June Lockhart (born June 25, 1925) is an American actress, beginning a film career in the late 1930s in such films at A Christmas Carol and Meet Me in St. Louis. She primarily acted in 1950s and 1960s television, and with performances on stage and in film. On two television series, Lassie and Lost in Space, she played mother roles. She also portrayed Dr. Janet Craig on the CBS television sitcom Petticoat Junction (1968–70). She is a two-time Emmy Award nominee and a Tony Award winner. With a career spanning 90 years,  she is one of the last surviving actors from the Golden Age of Hollywood.

Early life

June Lockhart was born on June 25, 1925, in New York City, New York. She is the daughter of Canadian-American actor Gene Lockhart, who came to prominence on Broadway in 1933 in Ah, Wilderness!, and English-born actress Kathleen Lockhart ((née Arthur). Her grandfather was John Coates Lockhart, "a concert-singer".

Lockhart attended the Westlake School for Girls in Beverly Hills, California.

Film 
Lockhart made her film debut opposite her parents in a film version of A Christmas Carol in 1938. She also played supporting parts in  Meet Me in St. Louis, Sergeant York, All This, and Heaven Too, and The Yearling. She played a key role in Son of Lassie (1945), a concept that she revisited at length during the television series Lassie more than a dozen years later. She was the top-billed star of She-Wolf of London (1946).

Stage
Lockhart debuted on stage at the age of 8, playing Mimsey in Peter Ibbetson, presented by the Metropolitan Opera. In 1947, her acting in For Love or Money brought her out of her parents' shadow and gained her notice as "a promising movie actress in her own right." One newspaper article began, "June Lockhart has burst on Broadway with the suddenness of an unpredicted comet."

In 1951, Lockhart starred in Lawrence Riley's biographical play Kin Hubbard  opposite Tom Ewell.

Television
In 1955, Lockhart appeared in an episode of CBS's Appointment with Adventure. About this time, she also made several appearances on NBC's legal drama Justice, based on case files of the Legal Aid Society of New York. In the late 1950s, Lockhart guest-starred in several popular television Westerns, including Wagon Train (in the episode "The Ricky and Laura Bell Story") and Cimarron City (in the episode "Medicine Man" with Gary Merrill) on NBC, and Gunsmoke, Have Gun – Will Travel, and Rawhide on CBS.

In 1958, Lockhart was the narrator for  Playhouse 90s telecast of the George Balanchine version of Tchaikovsky's The Nutcracker, featuring Balanchine himself as Drosselmeyer, along with the New York City Ballet.

Lockhart is best known for her roles as TV mothers, first as Ruth Martin, the wife of Paul Martin (portrayed by Hugh Reilly) and the mother of Timmy Martin (played by Jon Provost) in the 1950s CBS series Lassie (a role that she played from 1958 to 1964). She replaced actress Cloris Leachman, who, in turn, had replaced Jan Clayton – who had played a similar character earlier in the series. Following her five-year run on Lassie, Lockhart made a guest appearance on Perry Mason as defendant Mona Stanton Harvey in "The Case of the Scandalous Sculptor".  Lockhart then starred as Dr. Maureen Robinson in Lost in Space, which ran from 1965 to 1968 on CBS, opposite veteran actors Guy Williams and Jonathan Harris.

In 1965, Lockhart played librarian Ina Coolbrith, first poet laureate of California, in the episode "Magic Locket" of the syndicated Western series, Death Valley Days. Lockhart then appeared as Dr. Janet Craig on the final two seasons of the CBS sitcom Petticoat Junction (1968–1970); her character was brought in to fill the void created after Bea Benaderet died during the run of the show. She was a regular in the ABC soap opera General Hospital during the 1980s and 1990s, and was also a voice actor, providing the voice of Martha Day, the lead character in the Hanna-Barbera animated series These Are the Days on ABC during the 1970s.

Lockhart appeared as a hostess on the Miss USA Pageant on CBS for six years, the Miss Universe Pageant on CBS for six years, the Tournament of Roses Parade on CBS for eight years, and the Thanksgiving Parade on CBS for five years.

In 1986, Lockhart appeared in the fantasy film, Troll.  The younger version of her character in that film was played by her daughter, Anne Lockhart. They had previously played the same woman at two different ages in the "Lest We Forget" episode of the television series Magnum, P.I. (1981). In 1991, Lockhart appeared as Miss Wiltrout, Michelle Tanner's kindergarten teacher on the TV sitcom Full House. She also had a cameo in the 1998 film Lost in Space, based on the television series in which she had starred 30 years earlier. In 2002, she appeared in two episodes of The Drew Carey Show as Lewis's mother, Misty Kiniski, alongside fellow TV mom Marion Ross, who played Drew's mother.

In 2004, Lockhart voiced the role of Grandma Emma Fowler in Focus on the Family's The Last Chance Detectives audio cases. Lockhart starred as James Caan's mother in an episode of Las Vegas in 2004. Lockhart has since guest-starred in episodes of Cold Case and Grey's Anatomy, in the 2007 ABC Family television film Holiday in Handcuffs, and in the 2007 feature film Wesley.

In February 2013, Lockhart began filming for Tesla Effect, a video game that combines live-action footage with three-dimensional graphics, which was released in May 2014.

Recognition

In 1948, Lockhart received a Special Tony Award for Outstanding Performance by a Newcomer (a category that no longer exists) for her role on Broadway in For Love or Money. June donated her Tony Award to the Smithsonian Institution in 2008 for display in the museum's permanent entertainment archives. 

Lockhart was nominated for 2 Emmy awards. In 1953, she was nominated for Best Actress. In 1959, she was nominated for Best Actress in a Leading Role (Continuing Character) in a Dramatic Series for her role in Lassie. 

She has two stars on the Hollywood Walk of Fame, one for motion pictures (6323 Hollywood Boulevard) and one for television (6362 Hollywood Boulevard). Both were dedicated on February 8, 1960. In 2013, the National Aeronautics and Space Administration  awarded her the Exceptional Public Achievement Medal for inspiring the public about space exploration.

Personal life
In 1951, Lockhart married John F. Maloney. They had two daughters--Anne Lockhart and June Elizabeth. The couple divorced in 1959. She married architect John Lindsay that same year, but they divorced in October 1970 and she has not remarried. Politically active, Lockhart has been involved in the campaigns of Harry Truman, Adlai Stevenson II, John F. Kennedy, Lyndon B. Johnson, and Hubert Humphrey. Lockhart is a Roman Catholic.

Filmography

Films

Television

References

Further reading
  (Includes an interview with June Lockhart)

External links

 
 
 

1925 births
Living people
Actresses from New York City
American film actresses
American stage actresses
American television actresses
American people of English descent
American people of Canadian descent
Donaldson Award winners
Special Tony Award recipients
Metro-Goldwyn-Mayer contract players
20th-century American actresses
21st-century American actresses
American anti–Vietnam War activists
Beauty pageant hosts
Harvard-Westlake School alumni
California Democrats
New York (state) Democrats
California Republicans
New York (state) Republicans
Catholics from New York (state)